Boyuran, also rendered as Boyoran or Beyuran, may refer to:
 Boyuran-e Olya
 Boyuran-e Sofla